Nureyevo (Nöräy) is a rural locality (a selo) and the administrative centre of Nureyevsky Selsoviet, Sharansky District, Bashkortostan, Russia. The population was 331 as of 2010. There are 4 streets.

Geography 
Nureyevo is located 26 km southeast of Sharan (the district's administrative centre) by road. Izimka is the nearest rural locality.

References 

Rural localities in Sharansky District